The Thrombolysis In Myocardial Infarction (TIMI) Study Group, is an academic research organization (ARO) affiliated with Brigham and Women's Hospital and Harvard Medical School with a focus in the field of cardiovascular disease. The group has its headquarters in Boston, Massachusetts.

The TIMI Study Group was founded by physician Eugene Braunwald in 1984. Braunwald held the chairmanship until 2010, when he appointed Marc Sabatine to the position. Among the group's most important works is the TIMI Risk Score, which assesses the risk of death and ischemic events in patients with unstable angina (UA) or non-ST elevation myocardial infarction (NSTEMI).

TIMI Risk Score calculators

TIMI Risk Score for UA/NSTEMI
In patients with UA/NSTEMI, the TIMI risk score is a prognostication scheme that categorizes a patient's risk of death and ischemic events and provides a basis for therapeutic decision making.

TIMI Score Calculation (1 point for each):

 Age ≥ 65 years
 Known coronary artery disease (CAD) (stenosis ≥ 50%)
 ≥ 3 risk factors for CAD*
 ASA use in the last 7 days
 Severe angina (≥ 2 episodes w/in 24 hrs)
 ST changes ≥ 0.5mm
 Elevated serum cardiac biomarkers

*Risk factors include: family history of CAD, hypertension, hypercholesterolemia, diabetes, or being a current smoker.

Score interpretation:

% risk at 14 days of: all-cause mortality, new or recurrent MI, or severe recurrent ischemia requiring urgent revascularization.

'TIMI risk' estimates mortality following acute coronary syndromes. TIMI risk can be calculated on the TIMI website under "Clinical Calculators."

References

External links
 TIMI Website

Ischemic heart diseases
Medical scales